Landy may refer to:

People

Surname
 Alvin Landy, (1905–1967) was an American bridge administrator and player; inventor of the Landy convention
 Eugene Landy, (1929–2006) American psychologist and therapist 
 Derek Landy (born 1974), Irish author and screenwriter
 John Landy (1930–2022), Australian former track athlete and politician; namesake of Landy Field
 Michael Landy (born 1963), British visual artist 
 Sandra Landy (1938–2017), British world champion contract bridge player

Given name
 Landy Berzunza Novelo (born 1965), Mexican politician
 Landy Mattison (born 1983), American soccer defender
 Landy Scott (1919–2014), American midget car racing champion
 Landy Wen (born 1979), Taiwanese pop singer

Other uses
 Landy convention, a contract bridge convention
 Landy Field, an athletics field in South Geelong, Victoria, Australia
 Suzuki Landy, a Japanese minivan

See also
 Landi (disambiguation)